(ja) is dedicated glassware which was mainly used for   before World War II in Japan.

Early Kōrikoppu could be found by the end of the Meiji period (1868–1912), and individual texture patterns using a technique of aburidashi (a technique of glass-works that motifs come to the surface by difference in temperature) were developed until the beginning of the Shōwa period (1926–1989).

See also
Penny lick - an old small glass for serving ice cream in U.K.

References

Glass art
Japanese culture